Rise of the Great Machine is the debut and only studio album by the project Supermachiner. It was released on November 28, 2000, through Undecided Records. The album features artwork created by Jacob Bannon.

Writing and recording 
Writing for the album began in 1994 and soon after became a collection of four track recordings, however the project remained inactive for a number of years. When Converge had about six months of down time as the band searched for a drummer, Jacob Bannon and Ryan Parker found the time to resurrect the project. They entered GodCity Studios with Kurt Ballou in the winter of 1999, to take on the piles of old four track tapes they had. During the sessions, Ballou contributed a great deal to the album material both as an engineer and musician.

Bannon stated in an interview that many of the songs off Converge's Jane Doe came from Supermachiner, the project was claimed to inspire Jane Doe's experimental side. The songs "Jane Doe" and "Phoenix in Flight" were initially intended for the Supermachiner but Bannon thought "it made sense for Converge to play them."

Release 
Rise of the Great Machine was released on compact disc by Undecided Records in the summer of 2000. A 2xLP version was scheduled to be co-released by Undecided Records and Temperance Records in late 2000, but after continuous delays it was ultimately cancelled. In 2005, Undecided Records repressed the compact disc edition with a slightly updated layout.

In 2004, Icarus Records, a subsidiary of Bannon's Deathwish, Inc. record label, hand-made 50 copies of Rise of the Great Machine on compact disc. The release was sold exclusively at Converge's merch table during their You Fail Me 2K4 Tour (promoting You Fail Me) in September and October 2004. 

The album was reissued in 2008 by French record label E-Vinyl on a double LP, limited to 1000 copies.

Rust 

Eight years after the release of Rise of the Great Machine, Deathwish Inc. announced the release of Rust, a 30 track double CD that featured remastered versions of the Rise of the Great Machine tracks along with b-sides of forgotten songs and additional audio experiments done by the band. Rust was released on March 16, 2009.

Musical style and theme 
The music was much different than Bannon's band Converge, having more in common with influences Swans, Bauhaus, and others. The lyrical content is built around the rise of technology and the death of the individual.

Track listing 

 Track 13 "A New Day" is mislabeled "A New Day A New Loss" on the original Undecided Records issue of the album. As a result, track 14, "A New Loss" received the name of track 15 and track 15 received the name of track 16 and so on throughout the track listing, leaving the final track to be titled "Last".
 Disc one of Rust is a reissue of Rise of the Great Machine.

Personnel 
Supermachiner
 Jacob Bannon – vocals, guitar, electronics
 Ryan Parker – vocals, bass, electronics
Additional musicians
 Seth Bannon  – percussion, electronics
 Kurt Ballou – guitar, saxophone, electronics
 Akina Kawauchi – violin
Production and recording
 Kurt Ballou – producer, engineer at GodCity
 Dave Merullo – mastering, editing at M-Works
Artwork
 Jacob Bannon – design

References 

Supermachiner albums
2000 albums
Undecided Records albums